The Camp Hill line is a railway line in Birmingham which lies between Kings Norton on the Cross-City Line and Birmingham New Street via Grand Junction on the main lines from  and . The line once comprised the terminal approach of the Birmingham and Gloucester Railway to Curzon Street before it was incorporated into the Midland Railway.

The expansion of the Birmingham West Suburban Railway resulted in its usurping of the line as the service's main line, at which point it became known as the 'Camp Hill line' after its original terminus. Local passenger services on the line were ultimately ended in the 1940s and the intermediate stations on the line were closed. Since then it has been used primarily by freight trains and some longer-distance passenger trains only.

Local services are expected to resume on the route in late 2023 after a break of nearly 83 years. Expansion of these services via new chords connecting the line to Birmingham Moor Street are currently in the early planning stage.

History

The line was extended into Curzon Street – the main station in Birmingham at that time – in August the following year; with the original Camp Hill terminus being split into a smaller passenger station and a goods station, the latter of which remained open until 1966. The B&GR itself was incorporated into the Midland Railway in 1845. The terminus then later switched from Curzon Street to Birmingham New Street station upon its opening in 1854. 

In 1861 a junction was constructed at Bordesley, creating a north to south-east connection from the Camp Hill line to the Great Western Railway's mainline to Oxford and London  (which remains in use as the Chiltern Main Line), and allows trains from Oxford and beyond to run into Birmingham New Street via the Camp Hill line.

From this date Midland expresses from Derby to Bristol by-passed New Street, and ran via this route to Camp Hill station, where portions of the train bound for Birmingham New Street would be detached or attached from the train. As both the Midland Railway lines from Derby and Bristol approached New Street from the east, this arrangement avoided the need for them to reverse at New Street and thus save time. This arrangement was unsatisfactory, but it persisted until 1885 when the Midland Railway extended the BWSR into New Street from the west, allowing Derby to Bristol trains to run directly through New Street without reversing and rejoin the B&GR route at Kings Norton railway station. With the BWSR in effect replacing the former B&GR mainline as the express route to Birmingham New Street, the route became known as the Camp Hill line.

In 1892, the Lifford Curve opened, creating a north-facing connection between the Camp Hill line and the Birmingham West Suburban Railway, allowing a circular service to operate from New Street via the Camp Hill line and returning via the BWSR (or vice versa). Local passenger services and all six passenger stations along the Camp Hill line were closed as a wartime rationalisation of the network in 1941 and were confirmed as permanently closed in 1946. All station buildings were subsequently demolished.

Camp Hill
Brighton Road
Moseley
Kings Heath
Hazelwell
Lifford

Since then the line has been used by freight trains and some longer distance passenger trains only.

Future plans
The reinstatement of local rail services to the former Camp Hill line has been a long term aspiration of the city, and during 2007, Birmingham City Council announced that they were looking into the possibility of reopening the line between Kings Norton and Birmingham Moor Street via the construction of a railway viaduct from Sparkbrook to Bordesley, where trains would be taken into the "old" Birmingham Moor Street station. In October 2007, a 1,500-name petition was handed in to the council asking for the line to be re-opened. In 2013 the proposal was shelved indefinitely.

The 2007 proposed station sites were Moseley, Kings Heath, and Hazelwell.

In 2016, the newly created West Midlands Combined Authority revived the plans to restore local passenger services to the line, and declared it one of their priority transport schemes to be delivered by 2025.

In 2017, the newly elected Mayor of the West Midlands Andy Street pledged to get work started on restoring services to the line by 2020. Officials were said to be investigating the business case for a fourth station at Balsall Heath (previously called Brighton Road). This would mean  and Camp Hill would be the only stations not to be reopened.

In August 2017, West Midlands Trains announced plans as part of their franchise deal that the line would reopen by December 2019 as part of a £1 billion investment in the West Midlands. This included a new station at Moseley.

In February 2018, Mayor of the West Midlands, Andy Street, said that the viaduct would not be needed, as Hereford to Birmingham New Street trains, currently routed via University Station, could be diverted along the Camp Hill line to serve the three new stations (and which would also facilitate through train operation toward Shrewsbury), meaning that extra capacity at Birmingham New Street would not be required.

In July 2018 the Midlands Rail Hub proposal was unveiled, which included the reopening of Moseley, Kings Heath, and Hazelwell stations, and the building of 2 new viaducts near Bordesley station (known as the 'Bordesley Chords'). These chords would connect Birmingham Moor Street to Kings Norton to the southwest and Water Orton to the northeast.

In March 2021 it was announced that funding had been found for the project, with an opening date expected in 2023. In June 2022, West Midlands Rail Executive announced that following on from a public consultation, the three stations would be named Moseley Village, Kings Heath and Pineapple Road. An investigation into the business case for reopening Brighton Road as Balsall Heath railway station has since been awarded funding.

This line was identified by Campaign for Better Transport as a priority 1 candidate for reopening.

References

Bibliography

External links

Birmingham City Council Camp Hill Railway Line Study Public Report, July 2007
Birmingham City Council Detailed map of the proposed railway chord linking the Camp Hill line into Moor Street Station

Rail transport in Birmingham, West Midlands
Railway lines opened in 1840
1840 establishments in England
Railway lines closed in 1941
1941 disestablishments in England